Hemiseptella is a genus of bryozoans belonging to the family Calloporidae.

The species of this genus are found in South America.

Species:

Hemiseptella africana 
Hemiseptella filimargo 
Hemiseptella fistula 
Hemiseptella fragilis 
Hemiseptella granulosa 
Hemiseptella labiata 
Hemiseptella lacinia 
Hemiseptella lata 
Hemiseptella ogivaliformis 
Hemiseptella planulata 
Hemiseptella rectangulata 
Hemiseptella saucatsensis 
Hemiseptella tuberosa

References

Bryozoan genera